The Sachin State was a princely state belonging to the Surat Agency, former Khandesh Agency, of the Bombay Presidency during the era of the British Raj. Its capital was in Sachin, the southernmost town of present-day Surat district of Gujarat State.

History 
Sachin state was founded on 6 June 1791. Though over 85% of the subjects were Hindu, the state was ruled by Sunni Muslims of the Siddi dynasty of Danda-Rajpuri and Janjira State. The Siddi dynasty is of Abyssinian (Habesha) origin.

Sachin State was under the protection of the Maratha Peshwa until it became a British protectorate. It had its own cavalry, currency, and stamped paper, as well as a state band that included Africans.

Fatima Begum (1892–1983), one of the early superstars in Indian cinema and India's first female film director, was allegedly married to Nawab Sidi Ibrahim Muhammad Yakut Khan III of Sachin State. But Sachin royal family sources cast a veil over this claiming no record of a marriage or contract having taken place between the Nawab and Fatima Bai or of the Nawab having officially recognised their children, Sultana, Zubeida and Shehzadi, as his own.
Sultana, the daughter of Fatima Begum, became a leading figure in early Indian movies. Zubeida, leading actress of India's first talkie film Alam Ara (1931), was her younger sister.

Nawab Sidi Ibrahim Muhammad Yakut Khan III, Sachin State's last ruler, signed the accession to join the Indian Union on 8 March 1948. The state then became part of Surat district in Bombay Province.

After the Partition Zubaida stayed in India, while her sister Sultana moved to Pakistan where she married and had a daughter, Jamila Razzaq, who became a prominent Pakistani actress in the decade between the mid 1950s and the mid 1960s.

Rulers
The rulers of Sachin State bore the title 'Nawab' and were granted the right of a 9 gun salute by the British authorities.

Nawabs

6 Jun 1791 –  9 July 1802  Abdul Karim Mohammad Yakut Khan I  (b. 17.. – d. 1802) 
 9 July 1802 – 25 March 1853  Ibrahim Mohammad Yakut Khan I      (d. 1853) 
25 Mar 1853 –  1 December 1868  Abdul Karim Mohammad Yakut Khan II (b. 1802 – d. 1868) 
 1 December 1868 –  4 March 1873  Ibrahim Mohammad Yakut Khan II     (b. 1833 – d. 1873) 
 4 March 1873 –  7 January 1887  Abdul Kadir Khan                   (b. 1865 – d. 1896) 
 4 March 1873 – Jul 1886     .... -Regent
 7 February 1887 – 19 November 1930  Ibrahim Mohammad Yakut Khan III    (b. 1886 – d. 1930) 
 7 February 1887 –  4 May 1907  .... -Regent
19 Nov 1930 – 15 August 1947  Haydar Mohammad Yakut Khan         (b. 1909 – d. 1970)

See also
Siddis of Gujarat
Surat Agency
Political integration of India

References

External links

Early Indian Movies

Surat district
Princely states of Gujarat
Muslim princely states of India
African diaspora
1791 establishments in India
1948 disestablishments in India